Mızıkçam is an old pine tree in Kütahya Province, western Turkey. It is a registered natural monument of the country.

Mızıkçam is located at Domurköy village of Domaniç district in Kütahya Province. It is a black pine (Pinus nigra). Its age is dated to be more than 700 years old. The tree was registered a natural monument on July 12, 1993.

References

Kütahya Province
Natural monuments of Turkey
Protected areas established in 1993
1993 establishments in Turkey
Domaniç District
Individual trees in Turkey
Individual pine trees